"Every Week's Got a Friday" is a song recorded by Canadian country music duo High Valley for their fifth studio album and major-label debut, Dear Life (2016). It was written by group member Brad Rempel with Phil Barton and the record's producer, Seth Mosley. "Every Week's Got a Friday" was released August 8, 2016 as the Canadian lead single for the album and second released overall.

Background and release
Following the success achieved with their fourth studio album, County Line (2014), High Valley signed a record deal with Atlantic Records and Warner Music Nashville in October 2015. They began recording new music for their then-forthcoming project and re-released "Make You Mine" to the United States. The song also serves as the album's lead single in that market. The duo released "Every Week's Got a Friday" to Canadian country radio and digital retailers worldwide on August 26, 2016, serving as the record's first Canadian single. While "Every Week's Got a Friday" is available as a standalone digital single in the United States, it was not included on the American track listing for Dear Life, being replaced by "Make You Mine".

Chart performance
"Every Week's Got a Friday" entered the Canada Country chart at number 46 on the chart dated September 17, 2016. It rose from number 11 to its peak position of 8 on the chart dated October 29, 2016, earning the group its seventh consecutive top-10. The song did not enter the Canadian Hot 100, but did reach number 36 on the All-Format Airplay chart.

Music video
The official music video for "Every Week's Got a Friday" premiered through CMT Canada on October 13, 2016. It features the duo performing an impromptu performance of the song on the roof of a hardware store, where a large crowd assembles to watch them perform and to party. The video was shot on location in Millbrook, Ontario.

Charts

Release history

References

2016 songs
2016 singles
High Valley songs
Atlantic Records singles
Warner Music Group singles
Songs written by Seth Mosley
Songs written by Brad Rempel